The great potoo (Nyctibius grandis) is the largest potoo species and is widely distributed in Central and South America.

Much like owls, this species is nocturnal. It preys on large insects and small vertebrates, which it captures in sallies from high perches.

Possibly its most well known characteristic is its unique moaning growl that the great potoo vocalizes throughout the night, creating an unsettling atmosphere in the Neotropics with its nocturnal sounds.

Taxonomy
The great potoo was formally described in 1789 by the German naturalist Johann Friedrich Gmelin in his revised and expanded edition of Carl Linnaeus's Systema Naturae. He placed it with all the nightjar like species in the genus Caprimulgus and coined the binomial name Caprimulgus grandis. The great potoo is now one of the seven potoos placed in the genus Nyctibius that was introduced in 1816 by the French ornithologist Louis Jean Pierre Vieillot. The genus name is from Ancient Greek nuktibios  meaning "night-living", from nux "night" and bios "life". The species is monotypic: no subspecies are recognised.

Description 

The great potoo has a large head in relation to its body. The eyes are also very large with a brown to yellow iris and has a short but broad beak. Their wings are elliptical in shape and the tail is elongated. The feather colors vary with white, gray, black, and burgundy. The tail colors match with that of the rest of the body with the exception of white bars that can be seen going across the tail laterally. (see references below)
 Range in Mass: 
 Range in Length: 
 Range in wingspan: 
 Average Wingspan:

Distribution and habitat
They range from southern Mexico through northeastern Guatemala and through most of Central America down through South America as far as southeastern Brazil and Bolivia.

In general the great potoo are distributed from humid to semi-humid forested habitats. While this species is widely spreadout geographically there is little to no variation in their appearance such as size or plumage. The great potoo is found mostly in dense lowland forest, forest edges and clearings. It may also range into foothills (up to about 1,500 m elevation), second-growth, open woodlands (including plantations) and is sometimes seen around meadows, but they always require trees-etc., for their camouflaged imitative perch.

In the day they are normally found perching or nesting usually higher than 12 meters above ground level within big trees. The branches they choose to perch usually are nearly 20 to 30 centimeters in diameter. At night time, they may go to lower perches 1.5 meters above the ground, from which they hunt.

Behavior
This nocturnal predator is usually seen perched high above the ground while foraging, hawking when prey is spotted. After the pounce, the potoo almost always returns to its previous perch. Normally, during the day it perches upright on a tree stump, and is overlooked because it resembles part of the stump; this is a camouflage, not just by coloration, but a camouflage by the setting. The Great Potoo can be located at night by the reflection of light from its eyes as it sits vertical on a post, roost, or angled-tree trunk. Great potoos are shy and solitary creatures.

Breeding 
Breeding has been recorded as typically February to August, but depending on the portion of this bird's range breeding birds can be met with almost year-round. Few details are known of the brooding behavior, but about a month elapses before the offspring is seen alone at the nest. After about 5 weeks the nestling is a two-thirds version of the adult, but with a lighter build, paler plumage, shorter tail, and smaller bill with less rictal bristles. The fledging period must be at least 2 months. After this time span, the offspring do not return to the nest site.

Although the adult potoo likely has few natural predators, predation of eggs, nestlings and fledging is apparently not uncommon. Adults stay near the nest throughout the day and rely upon camouflage to protect their offspring. Predators, while not confirmed, of great potoo nests in Costa Rica have included monkeys such as mantled howlers, Geoffroy's spider monkeys and white-headed capuchins as well as tayras and collared forest falcons.

Feeding 
Their prey consists mostly of large flying insects, especially large beetles, katydids and Orthoptera (including crickets and grasshoppers). Bats and birds are taken occasionally as well. The great potoo takes advantage of the night and its natural camouflage by sitting on an exposed perch to wait until some prey flies by, at which point it darts out towards the prey and returns to the branch with it. Very often birds of this species will use the same hunting perch nightly.

Conservation status
Due to its large range, the great potoo is seen as a species of least concern, according to the International Union for Conservation of Nature (IUCN). The great potoo is normally described as "uncommon", but occurs frequently in areas of less disturbed forests and is often found to be rare along the edges of its range. The clearing of forest is the only conservation threat known to this bird.

Effects of humans
The local people in the rural area of Brazil sometimes use potoo as a minor food source, as they do not offer much meat and are hard to locate. In these areas, their feathers are believed to have powers to provide chastity, so they are hunted down for their body parts, which are used to perform ceremonies. It is also believed that parts of their body ward off seduction. Potoos fear most locals due to being hunted.

References 

 Borerro, J. 1974. Notes on the structure of upper eyelid of potoos.. The Condor, 76: 210–211.
 Land, H., W. Schultz. 1963. A proposed subspecies of the Great Potoo, Nyctibius grandis. Auk, 80: 195–196.
 
 Holyoak, D.T. (2001): Nightjars and their Allies: the Caprimulgiformes. Oxford University Press, Oxford, New York. 
 Adams, Kimberly. 2011. Great Potoo (Nyctibius grandis), Neotropical Birds Online (T. S. Schulenberg, Editor). Ithaca: Cornell Lab of Ornithology; retrieved from Neotropical Birds Online: http://neotropical.birds.cornell.edu/portal/species/overview?p_p_spp=222936

External links

 Great potoo on the Ebird
 Stamps (for Suriname) with RangeMap
 Photo-Medium Res; Article home.scarlet.be–"Northern Venezuela"
 Great potoo photo gallery VIREO (with camouflaged perching)

great potoo
Birds of Central America
Birds of Brazil
Birds of Venezuela
Birds of the Guianas
Birds of the Amazon Basin
Birds of the Atlantic Forest
great potoo
great potoo
Birds of Colombia